Küssnacht am Rigi railway station is a railway station in the municipality of Küssnacht, in the Swiss canton of Schwyz. It is an intermediate stop on the standard gauge Lucerne–Immensee line of Swiss Federal Railways.

Services 
 the following services stop at Küssnacht am Rigi:

  Voralpen-Express: hourly service between Lucerne and St. Gallen.
 Lucerne S-Bahn : hourly service between Lucerne and Brunnen.

References

External links 
 
 

Railway stations in the canton of Schwyz
Swiss Federal Railways stations